The 1996 German Formula Three Championship was the 22nd edition of the German Formula Three Championship. It commenced on 14 April 1996 and ended on 13 October. Italian driver Jarno Trulli won the title with six wins for the Swiss Opel Team KMS Benetton Formula.

Teams and drivers
{|
|

Race calendar and results
With the exception of round at Magny-Cours in France, all rounds took place on German soil.

Championship standings

A-Class
Points are awarded as follows:

B-Class
Points are awarded as follows:

† — Drivers did not finish the race, but were classified as they completed over 90% of the race distance.

See also
1996 Masters of Formula 3

References

External links
 

German Formula Three Championship seasons
German Formula Three
German Formula 3